Deathless is the fifth studio album by American technical death metal band Revocation, released on October 14, 2014 by Metal Blade Records. It is the band's last album to feature Phil Dubois-Coyne on drums.

The album entered the US Billboard 200 at #124, selling 3,075 copies in the first week.

Track listing

Personnel 
Writing, performance and production credits are adapted from the album liner notes.

Revocation
 David Davidson – lead guitar, lead vocals
 Dan Gargiulo – rhythm guitar, backing vocals
 Brett Bamberger – bass
 Phil Dubois-Coyne – drums

Production
 Zeuss – production, engineering, mixing
 Alan Douches – mastering

Artwork and design
 Tom Strom – cover art
 Brian J. Ames – layout

Chart performance

References

External links 
 
 Deathless at Metal Blade
 Deathless at Revocation's official website

2014 albums
Metal Blade Records albums
Revocation (band) albums
Albums produced by Chris "Zeuss" Harris